Karnataka State Highway 2, commonly referred to as KA SH 2, is a state highway that runs through Uttara Kannada, Haveri, Vijayanagara and Chitradurga districts in the state of Karnataka.  It starts from Ekkambi in Uttara Kannada District and terminates at Molakalmuru in Chitradurga District. The main destinations for this state highway are Sirsi, Haveri, Harapanahalli and Kudligi. The total length of the highway is 235 km.

Summary

Distance Chart

Route description 
The route followed by this highway is Yekkambi - Haveri - Mylara - Harapanahalli - Kudligi - Molakalmuru

Major junctions

National Highways 
 NH 4 at Haveri
 NH 13 at Kudligi

State Highways 
 KA SH 62 at Haveri
 KA SH 40 at Mylara
 KA SH 25 and KA SH 47 at Harapanahalli
 KA SH 45 at Kotturu
 KA SH 40 at Kudligi

Connections 

Many villages, cities and towns in various districts are connected by this state highway.

See also
 List of State Highways in Karnataka

References

State Highways in Karnataka
Roads in Uttara Kannada district
Roads in Haveri district
Roads in Davanagere district
Roads in Bellary district
Roads in Chitradurga district